146th meridian may refer to:

146th  meridian east, a line of longitude east of the Greenwich Meridian
146th meridian west, a line of longitude west of the Greenwich Meridian